Kopanya is a rural locality (a settlement) in Yasenkovskoye Rural Settlement, Bobrovsky District, Voronezh Oblast, Russia. The population was 75 as of 2010.

Geography 
Kopanya is located 10 km southwest of Bobrov (the district's administrative centre) by road. Yasenki is the nearest rural locality.

References 

Rural localities in Bobrovsky District